Drosera subg. Lasiocephala, sometimes collectively known as the petiolaris-complex, is a subgenus of 14 species in the genus Drosera. These species are distinguished by their subpeltate to peltate lamina.

The subgenus was first formally described by Jules Émile Planchon in 1848 as a section. Planchon included the species D. banksii in his arrangement, but it has been argued that D. banksii belongs in a clade with the more-closely allied D. subtilis. Ludwig Diels reclassified the genus in his 1906 monograph of the family and recognizing this taxon as a series under section Rossolis. In 1996, taxonomist Jan Schlauer argued for the recognition of this taxon at the rank of subgenus, noting that these closely related species share many affinities with subgenus Drosera but are different enough to warrant subgeneric status. All species in this subgenus are native to northern Australia except for D. petiolaris, which is more widely distributed to as far as New Guinea. The plants in this subgenus or petiolaris-complex mostly look like variations of the eponymous D. petiolaris.

See also
List of Drosera species
Taxonomy of Drosera

References

Plant subgenera
Lasiocephala